Monsignor  Rubén Isaza Restrepo was the first apostolic administrator of the Diocese of Ibagué, leading it from 1960 to 1964.

Biography
He was, at the time, the youngest bishop in Colombia since he was Auxiliary Bishop of Cartagena, who began to lead the diocese February 20, 1955 at the consecration of Paolo Bertoli, an ambassador of Pius XII. Born in Salamina, Caldas, Caldas, he died in Manizales in 1986. His remains rest in Manizales' cathedral. At the time of his death, he was Archbishop Emeritus of Cartagena.

References

External links and additional sources
 (for Chronology of Bishops)
 (for Chronology of Bishops)

1986 deaths
20th-century Roman Catholic archbishops in Colombia
Year of birth missing
Roman Catholic archbishops of Cartagena in Colombia
Roman Catholic bishops of Cartagena in Colombia
Roman Catholic bishops of Montería
Roman Catholic bishops of Ibagué